The Victoria night frog (Astylosternus diadematus) is a species of frog in the family Arthroleptidae.
It is found in Cameroon and possibly Nigeria.
Its natural habitats are subtropical or tropical moist lowland forests, subtropical or tropical moist montane forests, rivers, and heavily degraded former forest.
It is threatened by habitat loss.

References

Astylosternus
Frogs of Africa
Amphibians of Cameroon
Amphibians of West Africa
Taxa named by Franz Werner
Amphibians described in 1898
Taxonomy articles created by Polbot